Brook is a hamlet in the civil parish of Bramshaw, in Hampshire, England. It lies just inside the New Forest.

The hamlet contains a mix of 18th and 19th century cottages, just south of the village of Bramshaw. There are two inns in Brook on opposite sides of the road - The Green Dragon and The Bell Inn. Both buildings date from the 18th century, albeit with 19th and 20th century alterations. Brook is also home to the club-house of Bramshaw Golf Club, which claims to be the oldest golf club in Hampshire

Just south of the village at Lower Canterton lies the Rufus Stone. This stone is said to mark the place where in 1100 the then King of England, William Rufus, was killed by an arrow whilst out hunting. The arrow was fired by a French nobleman, Walter Tyrell, but it has never been established if the death was an accident or murder.

Notes

External links

Hamlets in Hampshire
New Forest